Mellor Clay (13 December 1883 – 5 March 1969) was a British gymnast. He competed in the men's team event at the 1908 Summer Olympics.

References

External links
 

1883 births
1969 deaths
British male artistic gymnasts
Olympic gymnasts of Great Britain
Gymnasts at the 1908 Summer Olympics
Place of birth missing